The UPEI Panthers women's ice hockey program represent the University of Prince Edward Island in the Atlantic University Sport (AUS) conference. The Panthers have won one AUS conference championship and have qualified for four U Sports women's ice hockey championship tournaments. They have served as the host team for the 2019 U Sports Women's Ice Hockey Championship, 2020 U Sports Women's Ice Hockey Championship, and the 2022 U Sports Women's Ice Hockey Championship, although the 2020 tournament was cancelled due to the COVID-19 pandemic in Canada. Despite being cancelled after one day, the 2020 event was named the SCORE! Event of the Year by PEI Amateur Sport.

History

Individual Leader Scoring

Team captains
2017-18: Emma Martin
2020-21: Kaylee Dufresne

U Sports Tournament results

International
Keirsten Visser : 2015 Winter Universiade

Awards and honours
 Nancy Macmillan: 2019 Hockey Canada Female Breathrough Award (recognizing an Outstanding contribution to advancing female hockey)

AUS Awards
2011-12: Bruce Donaldson, AUS Coach of the Year
2013-14: Ferran Brown, AUS Student-Athlete Community Service Award
2016-17: Sydnee Baker, AUS Rookie of the Year

AUS All-Stars
 Marie-Soleil Deschenes, 2016-17 AUS First Team All-Star
2016-17 AUS Second Team All-Stars: Emma Martin, UPEI
 Camille Scherger, 2019-20 AUS First Team All-Star
 Jolena Gillard , 2019-20 AUS Second Team All-Star

AUS All-Rookie
Jolena Gillard, 2018-19 AUS All-Rookie Team
Lexie Murphy, 2019-20 AUS All-Rookie Team

USports Awards
Camille Scherger, Goaltender, 2019-20 USports Second Team All-Canadian
Jolena Gillard, Forward, 2021-22 USports Second Team All-Canadian

Team Awards
2017-18 Gordon and Muriel Bennett Award (in recognition of best combined athletic achievement and academic excellence during four years): Emma Martin

Most Valuable Player
Kristy Dobson, 2011-12 UPEI Women's Ice Hockey Most Valuable Player
Jaimelynn Donaldson: 2012-13
Samantha Sweet: 2014-15
Samantha Sweet : 2015-16
Marie-Soleil Deschenes, 2016-17  
Camille Scherger, 2018-19 
Camille Scherger, 2019-20  
Jolena Gillard, 2021-22

Rookie of the Year
Laura Bradley, 2011-12 UPEI Women's Ice Hockey Rookie of the Year
Marie Soleil Deschenes: 2012-13
Emma Weatherbie: 2014-15
Sydnee Baker, 2016-17  
Jolena Gillard: 2018-19
Lexie Murphy, 2019-20  

Coaches Award
Alicia Betts, 2011-12 UPEI Women's Ice Hockey Coaches Award
Kaylee Dufresne, 2019-20 Principles of Panther Pride Coaches Award (presented by each coach to the student-athlete on their team that best exemplifies purpose, preparation, respect for people, positivity, professionalism, presence, passion, and perseverance)

University Awards
2012 UPEI Panthers Rookie of the Year Award (Female): Laura Bradley  
Marie-Soleil Deschenes, 2016-17 UPEI Female Athlete of the Year
Rachel Colle, 2019-20 PEI Panthers Athletics Passion for Life Award (Presented to a UPEI student-athlete who exemplifies his/her qualities and love of life by building Panther Sport spirit and serving the community)

Panther Athlete of the Week
Sophie Vandale:  Panther Subway Athletes of the Week, February 3 to 9, 2020 

Kaylee Dufresne, Panther Subway Athletes of the Week, January 27 to February 2, 2020

J.T. "Mickey" Place Award
Presented by the UPEI Student Union, the J.T. "Mickey" Place Award is awarded to varsity team student-athletes who made a contribution to student leadership on their team and on campus.

Amber Gaudette 2011-12 J.T "Mickey" Place Awards
Ferran Brown, 2012-13 J.T "Mickey" Place Awards 
Ferran Brown, 2014-15 J.T "Mickey" Place Awards
2016 J.T. “Mickey” Place Awards : Teagan Pringle 
 Teagan Pringle, 2016-17 J.T "Mickey" Place Awards
 Annabelle Charron and Rachel Colle, 2019-20 J.T "Mickey" Place Awards

References 

Sport in Charlottetown
University of Prince Edward Island
 U Sports women's ice hockey teams
Ice hockey teams in Prince Edward Island
Women in Prince Edward Island